Ermine is an unincorporated community in Letcher County, Kentucky, United States.  Its ZIP Code is 41815.

A post office was established in the community in 1904. The origins of the place name Ermine are unclear: it might have named for the first postmaster Ermine Webb, resident Ermine Hall, or resident Ermine Craft. Letcher County Central High School was established in the area in 2005.

References

Unincorporated communities in Letcher County, Kentucky
Unincorporated communities in Kentucky